Dave Torrey Arena is a 2,000-seat multipurpose arena located in St. Cloud, Minnesota.  It is used primarily for ice hockey, and is home to high school hockey teams.  It was built in 1972.

Most of the arena's seating, restrooms, concession stands, meeting and office rooms and a  mezzanine are the products of the 1994 renovations.

Adjacent is the 400-seat Ritsche Arena.

References

External links
Official page

Indoor arenas in Minnesota
Indoor ice hockey venues in Minnesota
Sports venues in Minnesota
Buildings and structures in St. Cloud, Minnesota